Keo Lôm is a commune (xã) and village of the Điện Biên Đông District of Điện Biên Province, northwestern Vietnam. The village is known as Ban Keo Lôm and lies to the southwest of the town of Điện Biên Đông. It is accessible via National Route 130 and then windy hillside roads in a notable mountain pass area.

References

External links
Maplandia World Gazetteer
Photograph
Video

Communes of Điện Biên province
Populated places in Điện Biên province